Transformers: Unicron is a science fiction comic book limited series presented by IDW Publishing, in collaboration with Hasbro. The series is being written by John Barber, with art from penciller Alex Milne and colorist Sebastian Cheng. Issue #0 was published during Free Comic Book Day (May 5, 2018) before running from July to October 2018, featuring references in Optimus Prime and Transformers: Lost Light.

The series introduces Unicron into the Hasbro Comic Book Universe following the events of "First Strike". The character had previously appeared on the Marvel comic book and the "Unicron Trilogy" anime series (Armada, Energon and Cybertron), specifically the comics version of the series produced by the defunct publisher Dreamwave Productions.

This series marks the conclusion of the Hasbro Comic Book Universe, primarily the Transformers comics, in advance of a reboot series in 2019.

Plot

Reception

Issues

Reboot

Since March 2019 to June 2022, a new Transformers comic written by Brian Ruckley was being published alongside a few spin-offs and tie-ins.

References

2018 comics endings
IDW Publishing titles
2018 comics debuts
Unicron
Rom the Space Knight